Roberval Davino da Silva (born 12 August 1954, in Maceió) is a retired Brazilian professional football player, who played as midfielder and currently a manager.

Began his professional career in the CRB in 1969. Later he played for the teams: XV de Jaú, Araçatuba, Capelense and Japanese IEC FC, where he finished his career in 1992. While still a player has started a coaching of the CRB in 1984. In the years 1985-1986 also worked in the Federação Alagoana de Futebol with the Seleção Alagoana. In 1986-1987 he trained CSA and in 1987-1988 club São Domingos. From 1988 to 1992 with break he led Japanese IEC FC. Since 1989 he coached the clubs: Novo Horizonte, Juventude, XV de Jaú, Goiânia, Goiás, Vila Nova, Araçatuba, Anápolis, Atlético-GO, Botafogo-SP, Lousano Paulista, Mogi Mirim, Mirassol, Matonense, Sampaio Corrêa, São Caetano, Inter de Limeira, União Barbarense, Figueirense, Marília, América-SP, Gama, Santa Cruz, Remo, América de Natal, Fortaleza, ABC, Santo André, Bragantino, Ituano, Guarani, Linense, Brasiliense, Metropolitano, Guaratinguetá, Corinthians-AL, Catanduvense, Paysandu, Luverdense and Sergipe.

Managing History

Honours

Player
 CRB
 Campeonato Alagoano: 1972, 1973, 1976, 1977, 1978, 1983
 Copa do Nordeste: 1975

Manager
IEC
 Kumamoto Division 3: 1989
 Kumamoto Division 2: 1990
 Kumamoto Division 1: 1991

 Vila Nova
 Campeonato Brasileiro Série C: 1996
 Campeonato Goiano: 1993

 Remo
 Campeonato Brasileiro Série C: 2005

 Araçatuba
 Campeonato Paulista Série A2: 1992

CSA
 Campeonato Alagoano: 1996, 1997

 Figueirense
 Campeonato Catarinense: 2002

 Brasiliense
 Campeonato Brasiliense: 2009
 Metropolitano
 Copa Santa Catarina: 2009

References

External links
  
 
 Profile at Soccerpunter.com

1954 births
Living people
People from Maceió
Brazilian footballers
Brazilian football managers
Expatriate football managers in Japan
Expatriate footballers in Japan
Association football midfielders
Campeonato Brasileiro Série A managers
Campeonato Brasileiro Série B managers
Campeonato Brasileiro Série C managers
Clube de Regatas Brasil players
Esporte Clube XV de Novembro (Jaú) players
Associação Esportiva Araçatuba players
Clube de Regatas Brasil managers
Centro Sportivo Alagoano managers
Esporte Clube Juventude managers
Esporte Clube XV de Novembro (Jaú) managers
Goiânia Esporte Clube managers
Goiás Esporte Clube managers
Vila Nova Futebol Clube managers
Associação Esportiva Araçatuba managers
Anápolis Futebol Clube managers
Atlético Clube Goianiense managers
Botafogo Futebol Clube (SP) managers
Paulista Futebol Clube managers
Mogi Mirim Esporte Clube managers
Mirassol Futebol Clube managers
Sociedade Esportiva Matonense managers
Sampaio Corrêa Futebol Clube managers
Associação Desportiva São Caetano managers
Associação Atlética Internacional (Limeira) managers
União Agrícola Barbarense Futebol Clube managers
Figueirense FC managers
Marília Atlético Clube managers
América Futebol Clube (SP) managers
Sociedade Esportiva do Gama managers
Santa Cruz Futebol Clube managers
Clube do Remo managers
América Futebol Clube (RN) managers
Fortaleza Esporte Clube managers
ABC Futebol Clube managers
Esporte Clube Santo André managers
Clube Atlético Bragantino managers
Ituano FC managers
Guarani FC managers
Clube Atlético Linense managers
Brasiliense Futebol Clube managers
Clube Atlético Metropolitano managers
Guaratinguetá Futebol managers
Sport Club Corinthians Alagoano managers
Paysandu Sport Club managers
Luverdense Esporte Clube managers
Club Sportivo Sergipe managers
Murici Futebol Clube managers
Capivariano Futebol Clube managers
Sportspeople from Alagoas